Lawrence Kutner is an American child psychologist best known as the author of the internationally syndicated "Parent & Child" column in the New York Times from 1987 to 1993. He is a former member of the psychiatry faculty at Massachusetts General Hospital, and the author of six popular books on child psychology and parent-child communication. He was the founder of the Center for Mental Health and Media at Massachusetts General Hospital. From 2009 to 2018, he was the executive director of the Jack Kent Cooke Foundation.

Works
(2008) Grand Theft Childhood: The Surprising Truth About Violent Video Games and What Parents Can Do (co-authored by Cheryl Olson)
(1998) Making Sense of Your Teenager (Parent & Child)
(1997) Your School-Age Child: From Kindergarten Through Sixth Grade 
(1995) Toddlers & Preschoolers (The Parent & Child Series)
(1994) Parent and Child: Getting Through to Each Other
(1993) Pregnancy and Your Baby's First Year (The Parent & Child)

External links 
 http://washington.bizjournals.com/washington/stories/2009/09/28/story13.html
 Helping Baby Boomers Raise Their Young Parenting: Lawrence Kutner has become a latter-day Dr. Spock by providing user-friendly advice and appealing to working couples.
 https://www.nytimes.com/1987/12/03/garden/parent-child.html
 http://www.jkcf.org/about-jkcf/our-people/dr-lawrence-kutner/

Massachusetts General Hospital faculty
American child psychologists
Living people
American columnists
20th-century American journalists
American male journalists
20th-century American male writers
21st-century American non-fiction writers
21st-century American male writers
The New York Times columnists
American medical writers
American male non-fiction writers
Year of birth missing (living people)